The House Show (2004) is a live album from singer-songwriter Derek Webb from his House Show tour, following the release of his first solo album, She Must and Shall Go Free.

Background

To provide further interaction with listeners, Webb embarked on the House Show Tour, in which he literally played his concerts in people's houses. That interaction can be heard clearly on The House Show, as nearly every other track is simply Webb speaking about the meaning behind his songs.

As Webb commented in the album liner notes, "For better or for worse, [She Must and Shall Go Free] wasn't an album best suited to big stage production. The songs are more simple than showy, and they have sparked discussion in some unlikely places...Since March 2003, I have played hundreds of these concerts or 'HOUSE SHOWS' – fifty or so people in someone's living room. Just songs and conversations with no production, no press."

Track listing

Personnel

Band
Derek Webb – Vocals, Six and 12-string Acoustic guitars

Technical
Production – Derek Webb
Recorded by – David Jacquin @ Weaver Auditorium, University of Mobile, AL
Edited by – Derek Webb and Sandra McCracken
Mixed by – Jimmy Jernigan, Playground Recording Studios, Nashville, TN
Mastered by – John Mayfield, Mayfield Mastering, Nashville, TN
Creative Director – Dana Salsedo
Art Direction – Derek Webb and Wayne Brezinka
Design, Layout & Illustrations – Wayne Brezinka

References

Live contemporary Christian music albums
Derek Webb albums
2004 live albums